The Sidney Martin House is a historic house located at 310 Sidney Martin Road in Lafayette, Louisiana.

Named after the person who owned the house between 1918 and 1976, the -story classic Creole raised cottage was built in c.1835. Some alterations were made in 1919, the more consistent being the roof line being lowered and the addition of second story columns. Despite 1919 alterations the exterior form of the house is almost intact.

The house was listed on the National Register of Historic Places on November 8, 1984.

See also
 National Register of Historic Places listings in Lafayette Parish, Louisiana

References

Houses on the National Register of Historic Places in Louisiana
Creole architecture in Louisiana
Federal architecture in Louisiana
Houses completed in 1835
Lafayette Parish, Louisiana
National Register of Historic Places in Lafayette Parish, Louisiana